Eupithecia brunneodorsata is a moth in the  family Geometridae. It is found in Peru.

References

Moths described in 1907
brunneodorsata
Moths of South America